The Millennium Universal College (TMUC) is a college in Pakistan.

Accreditation and affiliation 

It is affiliated with Edexcel International Examinations, United Kingdom.
It is affiliated with University of London United Kingdom for international degree Programs.
It holds a membership of Goethe institute Germany to promote German language in Pakistan.
Member of Islamabad Chamber of Commerce and Industry, Pakistan.

References

External links 

Universities and colleges in Pakistan